Families Advocating an Intelligent Registry, also known as USA FAIR, Inc., is  a non-profit organization based in Washington D.C. It is part of the growing movement to reform sex offender laws in the United States. USA FAIR seeks to educate the public on issues related to sex offender registries by focusing on the national news media, being a reliable contact for journalists to reach people who can speak of the issues first-hand, and holding them accountable for inaccurate coverage. USA FAIR was founded by family members of registrants; its members today include former offenders and allies from legal, social justice, and treatment communities.

On several occasions, through press releases and letters to editors, USA FAIR has requested corrections to inaccurate stories on sex offender issues.

USA FAIR has publicly expressed its concern that highly publicized, violent sex crimes provoke knee-jerk responses in the form of even harsher sex offender laws, while in fact most registrants have little in common with the dangerous predatory offenders. The Executive director of USA FAIR, Shana Rowan was interviewed by WHTVs CNY Central in 2013 in a story covering her personal history and the cause of USA FAIR.

In February 2013 USA FAIR publicly condemned Suffolk County's proposal, which was later passed, to award a $2.7 million sex offender management contract to Parents for Megan's Law, a non-profit private organization with no experience in sex offender management, to provide monitoring of people required to register with the sex offender registry.  USA FAIR called such a contract "government-sanctioned vigilantism", and demanded County Executive Steven Bellone conduct a Request for Proposals (RFP) to find the most qualified organization to provide such service. USA FAIR took the position that if sex offender management was to be done by a private organization, ATSA would be more suitable candidate. The New York affiliate of ACLU agreed with the criticism with USA FAIR.

Stated Mission
USA FAIR promotes "smart-on-crime solutions" to create more intelligent registry. USA FAIRs Statement of purpose lists 13 points of intelligent registry that would:
 recognize that sex offenders have the second lowest recidivism rates of all offender groups
 stop one-size-fits-all approach and target resources on monitoring the truly dangerous
 exempt so-called Romeo & Juliet offenders
 reduce the number of misdemeanor offenses that trigger mandatory registration
 classify risk levels based on a scientifically tested risk assessment of the individual offender
 reward good behavior by allowing law-abiding former offenders a process to have their risk level reduced
 incentivize good behavior by allowing offenders a process for relief from registration requirements
 limit public notification only to the truly dangerous
 recognize that listing place of employment on the public registry makes former offenders virtually unemployable and that job stability is a key factor in maintaining law-abiding behavior
 not trigger residency restrictions by recognizing that an offender's support system of family and friends and connections to the community are critical factors in rebuilding law-abiding lives
 help families stay intact following a sexual offense by a family member. At present, residency restrictions can uproot and displace entire families, causing spouses to lose employment and children to move out of their school district.
 recognize that first time offenders who are not listed on the registry commit 95% of all sex crimes.

Organization

Funding

See also
Alliance for Constitutional Sex Offense Laws
Arkansas Time After Time
Reform Sex Offender Laws, Inc.
Florida Action Committee
Advocates For Change
California Reform Sex Offender Laws
Illinois Voices for Reform
Michigan Citizens for Justice
Women Against Registry - W.A.R

References

External links
 USA FAIR, Inc. homepage

Sex offender registration
Civil liberties advocacy groups in the United States
Criminal justice reform in the United States